The Laclede Gas Building is a 31-story,  skyscraper located at 720 Olive Street in Downtown St. Louis, Missouri. It was designed by the Emery Roth & Sons architecture firm, and was built between 1967 and 1969 for the Laclede Gas Company, which had outgrown its 10-story building at 1017 Olive Street. The Laclede Gas Company vacated the building in March 2015, after 45 years in the space. The building has since been converted to mixed-use, and presently consists of both office and residential spaces.

Uniquely, all power for the building is generated in-house using natural gas burning generators, and therefore is not interconnected to the local electricity provider.

The building also houses one of the eastbound entrances to MetroLink's 8th & Pine subway station.

See also
List of tallest buildings in Missouri
List of tallest buildings in St. Louis

References

Office buildings completed in 1969
Skyscraper office buildings in St. Louis
Emery Roth buildings
Downtown St. Louis
Buildings and structures in St. Louis
1969 establishments in Missouri